Ted Crawford Sizemore (born April 15, 1945) is a former Major League Baseball second baseman.

Early life
Sizemore was born in Gadsden, Alabama, but moved to Detroit, at the age of two years. As a catcher for Pershing High School's baseball team, he earned All-city honors three times. He also earned All-city honors playing fullback in football and guard in basketball twice each. He was high school teammates with Basketball Hall of Famer Mel Daniels playing under coach Will Robinson.

College career

In 1966, he batted .321 to receive District All-America honors. In , the university created the "Ted Sizemore Award" to honor the school's top defensive player each season.

Baseball career
The Los Angeles Dodgers selected Sizemore in the fifteenth round of the 1966 Major League Baseball draft. Following Zoilo Versalles' departure in the 1968 Major League Baseball expansion draft, manager Walter Alston shifted Sizemore over to shortstop at the beginning of Spring training .

Los Angeles Dodgers I (1969-1970) 
Sizemore won the starting shortstop job that spring. Despite a two error performance against the San Francisco Giants, Sizemore proved himself an adequate shortstop. Still, with second baseman Jim Lefebvre not hitting, Sizemore began seeing more time at second by the end of his first month in the majors. With Maury Wills' acquisition on June 11, the move became permanent.

With his bat, Sizemore got off to a hot start in his rookie season, but cooled off in June and July. He picked it up again in the final two months of the season to finish at .271 with four home runs 46 runs batted in and 69 runs scored. He received fourteen of 24 first place votes to be named the National League's Rookie of the Year.

He was batting .257 with one home run, twelve RBIs and fourteen runs scored when he ruptured his thigh muscle on June 11 against the St. Louis Cardinals. He returned in late July, and his hitting actually improved. He batted .342 to bring his season average to .306 until a sprained wrist ended his season. That winter, he and minor league catcher Bob Stinson were traded to the Cardinals for slugging first baseman Dick Allen.

St. Louis Cardinals (1971-1975) 
He began his tenure with the Cardinals splitting time between shortstop and second base, but as the  season wore on, he began taking more and more playing time away from veteran Julián Javier at second. He batted .264 each of his first two seasons in St. Louis. In , Sizemore usually batted second behind Hall of Famer Lou Brock. Brock set a record with 118 stolen bases that season, and credited Sizemore's patience at the plate batting behind him as a big factor.

Perhaps his most dramatic moment with the Cards came in an extra innings affair with the New York Mets on August 7, . Leading off the bottom of the thirteenth inning, Sizemore hit a walk-off inside-the-park home run off Tug McGraw. The low point of his Cardinals career also came against the Mets. On April 17, Sizemore tied a record for major league second basemen with three errors in an inning.

Los Angeles Dodgers II (1976) 
On March 2, Sizemore returned to the Dodgers in exchange for outfielder Willie Crawford. He was acquired for his versatility, and in the event that a proposed deal sending shortstop Bill Russell to the Cardinals for outfielder Reggie Smith ever materialized (in which case, second baseman Davey Lopes would move to short, and Sizemore would inherit the second base job).

A deal for Smith would not be worked out until June 15, after the season started, and the Cardinals settled for minor league infielder Fred Tisdale in the package for Smith, instead. However, a pulled rib muscle by Lopes in Spring training had Sizemore opening the season as the Dodgers' starting second baseman regardless.

Catching debut 
As the game with the Houston Astros went into its tenth inning on August 2, Alston moved Sizemore from second base to catcher for the first time in his major league career. He handled Elias Sosa for two innings without incident. This was followed by a complete game behind the plate on September 19 against the Atlanta Braves. Aside from a wild pitch in the fourth, he handled Tommy John perfectly, as they held the Braves to one run and six hits. The final out of the game was a pop up by Pat Rockett caught by Sizemore in foul territory.

Philadelphia Phillies (1977-1978) 
The National League East champion Philadelphia Phillies were in dire need of a second baseman following All-Star Dave Cash's departure via free agency. At the 1976 Winter meetings, they swung a deal for Sizemore for back-up catcher Johnny Oates.

He reached the post-season for the first time in his career, as the Phillies duplicated their 101-61 record from the previous season to face Sizemore's former team, the Dodgers, in the 1977 National League Championship Series. With the Phillies leading 5-3 in the ninth inning of game three, Sizemore committed an error on a throw from left fielder Greg Luzinski that opened the door for the Dodgers to score three runs and steal a 6-5 victory. It was Sizemore's second error of the series, won by the Dodgers in four games.

On April 28, Sizemore broke his hand on a play at second base with the San Diego Padres' Gene Richards. The injury sidelined Sizemore until the end of June, and likely played a part in the career low .219 batting average he put up that year. Regardless, the Phillies repeated as division champions, and Sizemore provided the Phillies with one of the few bright spots in their line-up in the 1978 National League Championship Series. The Dodgers once again defeated the Phillies in four games, however, Sizemore batted .385 with a triple, an RBI and three runs scored.

Chicago Cubs (1979) 
He, Barry Foote, Jerry Martin and minor leaguers Derek Botelho and Henry Mack went to the Cubs for Greg Gross, Dave Rader and Manny Trillo.

Boston Red Sox (1979-1980) 
Toward the end of his only season in Chicago, he was dealt to the Boston Red Sox for a player to be named later when Bosox starting second baseman Jerry Remy and his back-up, Jack Brohamer, were both sidelined with injuries. In his first game in the American League, he went three-for-three with a double, two RBIs and a run scored. The Red Sox also used him twice at catcher shortly after his acquisition.

Sizemore won a reserve job with the Sox out of Spring training , but with the emergence of rookie Dave Stapleton at second base, saw very little action. The Red Sox explored the possibility of selling the veteran to another club, but found no takers, and released him on May 30.

Personal
After Sizemore's retirement as a player, he went to work for baseball glove manufacturer Rawlings, as their chief liaison with major league players.

Currently, Sizemore serves as the CEO of the Baseball Assistance Team, a 501(c)(3) non-profit organization dedicated to helping former Major League, Minor League, and Negro league players, as well as scouts, umpires, and office personnel, through financial and medical hardships.

Career stats

Sizemore was part of a core of young Dodgers prospects that became known as "The Mod Squad" after the popular TV series of the same name, and appeared on the cover of the May 19, 1969 edition of Sports Illustrated, along with his fellow Mod Squad members.

References

External links

1945 births
Living people
Albuquerque Dodgers players
Arizona Instructional League Dodgers players
Baseball players from Alabama
Boston Red Sox players
Chicago Cubs players
Los Angeles Dodgers players
Major League Baseball Rookie of the Year Award winners
Major League Baseball second basemen
Michigan Wolverines baseball players
Philadelphia Phillies players
St. Louis Cardinals players
Spokane Indians players
Baseball players from Detroit
Sportspeople from Gadsden, Alabama
Tri-City Atoms players
Pershing High School alumni